Khaliq Ur Rehman Khattak is a Pakistani politician who had been a member of the Provincial Assembly of Khyber Pakhtunkhwa representing Pakistan Tehreek-e-Insaf hailing from Dag Ismail Kheil, Pabbi, Nowshera. He won elections in 2013 and 2018 under constituency of PK-12 & PK 65 Nowshera defeating a prominent ANP Leader Mian Iftikhar Hussain. He served as Advisor to the Chief Minister on Excise and Taxation.

References

Pakistan Tehreek-e-Insaf MPAs (Khyber Pakhtunkhwa)